James John Lacey (22 November 1887 – 9 April 1956) was an Australian rules footballer who played with South Melbourne and Richmond in the Victorian Football League (VFL).

Notes

External links 

1887 births
1956 deaths
Australian rules footballers from Victoria (Australia)
Sydney Swans players
Richmond Football Club players